Smeerenburgbreen is a glacier in Albert I Land at Spitsbergen, Svalbard. It is located east of Reuschhalvøya. The glacier debouches into Bjørnfjorden, the inner part of Smeerenburgfjorden. Smeerenburg was the name of a Dutch whaling station from the 17th century located on Amsterdam Island.

References 

Glaciers of Spitsbergen